Tadesse Alemu was an Ethiopian singer from Wollega who sang traditional Ethiopian songs, sometimes Christian-based, in an upbeat pop-music style with the modern-day electronic instrumentation that is characteristic of today's Ethiopian popular music. Active since 1997, nothing was known about his origins. However, an interview with Alemu's wife on Voice of Ethiopia radio during fall 2007 confirmed that he had become sick and died that July in Addis Ababa of a short disease, which resulted from an infection that was caused by a stabbing wound from several years previously that had not healed properly, just before he was set to leave the country on a concert tour.

Partial discography
 Ethiopian Wedding Songs (1997)
 Erikum (1998 or 1999)
 Mahider Zema (2000)
 Mishamisho (2001)
 Wedding Songs (2003)

External links
 
 

Year of birth missing
2007 deaths
Amharic-language singers
20th-century Ethiopian male singers
Ethiopian Christians
People from Oromia Region
 deaths by stabbing
21st-century Ethiopian male singers